Liptovský Peter is a village and municipality in Liptovský Mikuláš District in the Žilina Region of northern Slovakia.

History 
In historical records the village was first mentioned as Scentpeter in 1286.

Geography 
The municipality lies at an altitude of 681 metres and covers an area of 6.123 km². It has a population of about 1361 people.

References

External links 

 Official page
 https://web.archive.org/web/20071217080336/http://www.statistics.sk/mosmis/eng/run.html

Villages and municipalities in Liptovský Mikuláš District